The Komsomol direction or Komsomol travel ticket was a mobilization document of in the Soviet Union issued by a Komsomol committee to a Komsomol member, which directed the member to temporary or permanent shock construction projects or military service. Usually the Komsomol direction was associated with relocation to new, poorly settled remote locations: new construction sites ("Komsomol construction sites"), army service, etc. The travel ticket appeared as a type of organizational mobilization after the adoption of the Soviet Labor Code.

During the 10th five-year plan more than 500,000 young volunteers were assigned to shock construction projects with Komsomol travel tickets. Komsomol organizations formed and directed 100 All-Union squads consisting of 80,000 people.

At the construction sites travel tickets recipients earned labor days, which were assigned different values that depended on the type of work was performed.

The word "putyovka" normally has the meaning of a vacation. During the Soviet period "putyovka" were given to Soviet pioneers to the Artek summer camp, "putyovka" was granted to working intelligentsia, factory workers and other party committee members for vacationing and health improvement "sanatoriums" that were assigned to the particular factories. Instead, the "Komsomolskaya putyovka" carried a special meaning.

Eponymous songs
Комсомольская путёвка, lyrics: Dolmatovsky, music: Pakhmutova
Комсомольская путёвка (1959), lyrics: , music: Serafim Tulikov

Gallery

See also
 Shock construction projects
 Road to Life (1931 film) – "Putyovka" into Life

References

External links
 Denis Lapin. Komsomlskaya putyovka (Комсомольская путевка). Infodon.org. 30 October 2012.
 Viktor Trushkov. Komsomlskaya putyovka (Комсомольская путевка). Pravda at the KPRF. 2018

Komsomol
Identity documents of the Soviet Union
Propaganda in the Soviet Union
Soviet phraseology
Economy of the Soviet Union
Volunteering in the Soviet Union

ru:Комсомольская путёвка